Luskintyre Airfield is a private aerodrome in the Hunter Region of New South Wales, Australia. The museum has the largest fleet of operational Tiger Moths in Australia. There are five hangars on the property used for storage and restoration.

History and events

The property was purchased from a local dairy farmer in 1977 by a group of local pilots 
Jimmy wall
Barney Riordan 
Alan Wilson 
Trevor blessing
Frank Williams 
Allan Coulthard
Geoff Kubank 
with the aim of creating their own private airfield,
restoring and operating vintage aircraft. A company specialising in the repair and restoration of early de Havilland aircraft was later relocated from Dungog by its then owner ray windred and has operated from a hangar on the airfield for over 30 years.

On 1 May 1994, a Tiger Moth was to c/o a wing walking display for a group of canteen kids (kids with cancer)
On take-off a carburettor fault caused a lost engine power, the port wing stalled and the aircraft spun into the ground and burst into flames
at Luskintyre. Both the pilot and the wing-walker were killed in the accident.

In October 2003, Tiger Moths from Luskintyre participated in The Great Tiger Moth Air Race, an event celebrating 100 years of powered flight and sponsored by aircraft manufacturer Airbus. In September 2010, the airfield hosted flying displays and events coinciding with the 100th anniversary of the first de Havilland aircraft.

'Lunch with the Tiger Moths' is a regular event held on the first Saturday of each month (weather permitting). The event allows visitors to inspect airworthy and under-restoration Tiger Moths and view the museum's collection of memorabilia.

Many recreational pilots as well as professional pilots use the airfield. It is also frequented by aerobatic champion Paul Bennet, and his formation flying team the SkyAces.

See also
 de Havilland Australia
 List of airports in New South Wales

References

External links
 Luskintyre Airfield official website

Airports in New South Wales
Transport museums in New South Wales
Aerospace museums in Australia
Air transport in the Hunter Region
Maitland, New South Wales
Airports established in 1977
Museums established in 1977